Denmead was a Baltimore, Maryland, United States, company that produced about 30 steam locomotives in the 1850s as a sideline to a very successful foundry.

During the American Civil War, A & W Denmead & Son built the side wheel gunboat Monocacy and the light draft monitor Waxsaw, both completed in 1865.

Defunct locomotive manufacturers of the United States
Foundries in the United States
Industrial buildings and structures in Maryland
Maryland in the American Civil War